Yang Tsung-hua and Yi Chu-huan won the last edition in 2009.
Prakash Amritraj and Philipp Oswald won the title, defeating Sanchai Ratiwatana and Sonchat Ratiwatana 6–3, 6–4 in the final.

Seeds

Draw

Draw

References
 Main draw

Doubles